The 1922 Oklahoma Sooners football team represented the University of Oklahoma in the 1922 college football season. In their 18th year under head coach Bennie Owen, the Sooners compiled a 2–3–3 record (1–2–2 against conference opponents), finished in sixth place in the Missouri Valley Conference, and were outscored by their opponents by a combined total of 114 to 66.

No Sooners were recognized as All-Americans, and end Howard Marsh was the only Sooner to receive all-conference honors.

Schedule

References

Oklahoma
Oklahoma Sooners football seasons
Oklahoma Sooners football